Alleroy is the name of several rural localities in the Chechen Republic, Russia:
Alleroy, Kurchaloyevsky District, Chechen Republic, a selo in Alleroyevskaya Rural Administration of Kurchaloyevsky District
Alleroy, Nozhay-Yurtovsky District, Chechen Republic, a selo in Alleroyevskaya Rural Administration of Nozhay-Yurtovsky District